(FIRA) is an international organisation organising competitive soccer – usually 5-a-side – competitions between autonomous  robots.

History
In 1996 and 1997, this competition was known as MiroSot and was held in Daejeon, Korea. The 1996 competition offered a challenging arena to the younger generation and researchers working with autonomous mobile robotic systems.

From 1998 through 2008, it was called the FIRA Cup, and in 2009, it became the FIRA RoboWorld Cup & Congress. The 15th RoboWorld Cup was held at Amrita Vishwa Vidyapeetham, Bangalore, India in September 2010.

In 2013, it took place in Kuala Lumpur, Malaysia. The championship started on August 24, 2013, and ended on August 29.  At that time, it involved five categories: Micro-Robot Soccer Tournament, Amire, Naro, Simulated Robot, Android, Robo and Humanoid Robot.
It attracted teams from Singapore, Indonesia, Taiwan, India, China, South Korea, the United Kingdom, Mexico, Canada, Russia and Malaysia. 80 teams from 11 countries participated.

The 2015 RoboWold Cup was held in Hefei in China, with more than 500 teams taking part from 45 different countries.

As of 2018, the competition had 277 teams participating from 12 countries.

FIRA RoboWorld Cup & Congress
This competition has 4 leagues: FIRA AIR, FIRA Sports, FIRA Challenges, and FIRA Youth.  Each league has its own competitions, and each competition can have several events.

FIRA AIR
The FIRA AIR league has two associated competitions, Autonomous Race and Emergency Service.

FIRA Sports
The FIRA Sports league has four associated competitions, HuroCup, RoboSot, SimuroSot, and AndroSot.  This the robot soccer league.

HuroCup consists of single events for bipedal humanoid robots. The events are: archery, sprint, marathon, united soccer, obstacle run, long jump, spartan race, marathon, weightlifting, and basketball. There is an all-round competition for the single robot that performs the best overall.

FIRA Challenges
The FIRA Challenges league has three associated competitions, Swarm Robots, Wheeled Challenge, and Mini-DRC Humanoid.

FIRA Youth
The FIRA Youth league has six associated challenges, Sport Robots, HuroCup Junior, CityRacer, DRV_Explorer, Cliff Hanger, and Mission Impossible.

References

External links
  
 FIRA RoboWorld Cup & Congress
 A view at 2010 RoboWorldCup In India

Robot football
Organizations established in 1997
Robotics organizations